The Eurovision Song Contest 1977 was the 22nd edition of the annual Eurovision Song Contest. The contest was hosted by English journalist Angela Rippon.

Eighteen countries participated in the contest;  returned after its absence from the previous edition, while  decided not to enter.

Greece's fifth place finish was their best result up to that point.

Location 
Wembley Conference Centre was chosen to host the contest. The venue was the first purpose-built conference centre in the United Kingdom, and opened on 31 January 1977 - making it a newly built venue at the time. It was demolished in 2006.

Format 

This was most possibly the Eurovision with the most scoring mistakes, as the scrutineer Clifford Brown had to stop the host Angela Rippon several times to correct the scores. For the first time in the contest's history, the flags of the competing nations were displayed on the scoreboard next to the country's name.

Participating countries 

 was set to participate in the contest and had been drawn to participate in fourth place, but later withdrew.  decided not to enter this contest and would not return to the contest until 1981 (they did however still broadcast the show), while Sweden returned to the competition, having missed out the year before. This made for eighteen participating nations.

The Belgian act Dream Express had created some controversy in the press with reports that the three female members would wear transparent tops; this did not materialise for the actual event.

The British conductor Ronnie Hazlehurst used an umbrella and wore a bowler hat during the UK entry.

Conductors 
Each performance had a conductor who led the orchestral accompaniment.

 Noel Kelehan
 Yvon Rioland
 Harry van Hoof
 
 Carsten Klouman
 Ronnie Hazlehurst
 Johnny Arthey
 José Calvário
 Ronnie Hazlehurst
 Giorgos Hatzinasios
 
 
 Anders Berglund
 
 Maurizio Fabrizio
 Ossi Runne
 Alyn Ainsworth
 Raymond Donnez

Returning artists

Participants and results 

The following tables reflect the final official scores, verified after the contest transmission. During the voting sequence of the live show, several errors were made in the announcement of the scores, which were then adjusted after the broadcast. Both Greece and France duplicated scores, awarding the same points to multiple countries. From the Greek scores, The UK, Netherlands, Austria and Finland all had 1 point deducted after the contest and from the French scores, Austria, Germany, Israel, Italy and Belgium all had 1 point deducted. None of the adjustments affected the placing of any of the songs.

Detailed voting results

12 points 
Below is a summary of all 12 points in the final:

Spokespersons 

Listed below is the order in which votes were cast during the 1977 contest along with the spokesperson who was responsible for announcing the votes for their respective country.

 Brendan Balfe
 Carole Chabrier
 
 
 
 Armin Maiwald
 Jacques Harvey
 Ana Zanatti
 Colin Berry
 
 
 Michel Stocker
 Sven Lindahl
 
 
 Kaarina Pönniö
 An Ploegaerts
 Marc Menant

Broadcasts 

Each participating broadcaster was required to relay the contest via its networks. Non-participating EBU member broadcasters were also able to relay the contest as "passive participants". Broadcasters were able to send commentators to provide coverage of the contest in their own native language and to relay information about the artists and songs to their television viewers.

Known details on the broadcasts in each country, including the specific broadcasting stations and commentators are shown in the tables below. In addition to the participating countries, the contest was also reportedly broadcast in Algeria, Denmark, Iceland, Jordan, Morocco, Tunisia, Turkey and Yugoslavia, in Bulgaria, Czechoslovakia, Hungary, Poland, Romania and the Soviet Union via Intervision, and in Hong Kong.

Incidents

Strike at BBC
As noted in The Eurovision Song Contest – The Official History by author and historian John Kennedy O'Connor, the contest was originally planned to be held on 2 April 1977, but because of a strike of the BBC cameramen and its technicians, it got postponed for a month. As a result, this is the first Eurovision Song Contest to be staged in May since the inaugural edition.

Postcards
Due to strikes by the BBC camera staff, and lack of time to organise the contest, there were no postcards for the viewers in between the songs. However, various shots of the contest's audience were shown, with the various countries' commentators informing the viewers of the upcoming songs. The intended postcards had been devised using footage of the artists in London during a party hosted by the BBC at a London nightclub. When the postcards were seen for the first time by the participant heads of delegation at the Friday dress rehearsal the day before the final, the Norwegian delegation objected to the way their artist was portrayed. However, as it was not possible for the BBC to edit or revise footage, all the postcards had to be dropped from the broadcast. Footage from the party still formed the interval act broadcast prior to the voting sequence.

See also 
 OTI Festival 1977

Notes

References

External links

 

 
1977
Music festivals in the United Kingdom
1977 in British music
1977 in London
May 1977 events in Europe
Events in London